Massachusetts Senate's Norfolk and Plymouth district in the United States is one of 40 legislative districts of the Massachusetts Senate. It covers 18.9% of Norfolk County and 6.8% of Plymouth County population. Democrat John Keenan of Quincy has represented the district since 2011.

Locales represented
The district includes the following localities:
 Abington
 Braintree
 Holbrook
 Quincy
 Rockland

Senators 
 Kenneth Nash
 Walter Shuebruk
 Newland H. Holmes, circa 1935-1957 
 William D. Weeks, circa 1969 
 Allan Robert McKinnon, circa 1979 
 William Brownell Golden, circa 1985 
 Robert Hedlund, circa 1991
 Brian J. McDonald, circa 1993 
 Michael W. Morrissey, circa 2002 
 John F. Keenan, 2011-current

Images
Portraits of legislators

See also
 List of Massachusetts Senate elections
 List of Massachusetts General Courts
 List of former districts of the Massachusetts Senate
 Plymouth County districts of the Massachusetts House of Representatives: 1st, 2nd, 3rd, 4th, 5th, 6th, 7th, 8th, 9th, 10th, 11th, 12th
 Norfolk County districts of the Massachusetts House of Representatives: 1st, 2nd, 3rd, 4th, 5th, 6th, 7th, 8th, 9th, 10th, 11th, 12th, 13th, 14th, 15th

References

External links
 Ballotpedia
  (State Senate district information based on U.S. Census Bureau's American Community Survey).
 

Senate 
Government of Norfolk County, Massachusetts
Government of Plymouth County, Massachusetts
Massachusetts Senate